Sclavia may refer to:

 in medieval history: common Latin term for any region inhabited by the Slavs
 in natural history: the Sclavia Craton, an ancient geological formation of the Archean period

See also
 Sclavi (disambiguation)
 Sclavonia (disambiguation)